Salinimicrobium xinjiangense is a Gram-negative, moderately halophilic, rod-shaped and non-motile bacterium from the genus of Salinimicrobium which has been isolated from a saline lake from Xinjiang in China.

References

Flavobacteria
Bacteria described in 2008